Relagh is a locality and townland in County Fermanagh, Northern Ireland. Relagh is located at 54° 23' 29" N, 7° 34' 50" W and is 3km north of Enniskillen and southeast of Ballinamallard. It is in the Magheracross Civil Parish.

References

Villages in County Fermanagh
Townlands of County Fermanagh